Pahi may refer to:

Places
Páhi, a village in Hungary
Kampung Pahi, a village in Malaysia
Pahi River, a river in New Zealand
Pahi, New Zealand, a village in New Zealand
Pahi (Tanzanian ward), in Tanzania
Pahi, Unnao, a village in Sikandarpur Karan CDB, Uttar Pradesh, India

Other uses
Pahi (ship), a traditional Tahitian watercraft
Pahi language, a language of Papua-New Guinea
Pahi language (Nepal), or Pahari, a language of Nepal
Te Pahi, a Māori tribal leader